Peter Villano (born January 26, 1924) is an American politician who served in the Connecticut House of Representatives from the 91st district from 1993 to 2013.

References

1924 births
Living people
Democratic Party members of the Connecticut House of Representatives